Corporate finance is the area of finance that deals with the sources of funding, and the capital structure of corporations, the actions that managers take to increase the value of the firm to the shareholders, and the tools and analysis used to allocate financial resources. The primary goal of corporate finance is to maximize or increase shareholder value.

Correspondingly, corporate finance comprises two main sub-disciplines.  Capital budgeting is concerned with the setting of criteria about which value-adding projects should receive investment funding, and whether to finance that investment with equity or debt capital. Working capital management is the management of the company's monetary funds that deal with the short-term operating balance of current assets and current liabilities; the focus here is on managing cash, inventories, and short-term borrowing and lending (such as the terms on credit extended to customers).

The terms corporate finance and corporate financier are also associated with investment banking. The typical role of an investment bank is to evaluate the company's financial needs and raise the appropriate type of capital that best fits those needs. Thus, the terms "corporate finance" and "corporate financier" may be associated with transactions in which capital is raised in order to create, develop, grow or acquire businesses. 

Although it is in principle different from managerial finance which studies the financial management of all firms, rather than corporations alone, the main concepts in the study of corporate finance are applicable to the financial problems of all kinds of firms.
Financial management overlaps with the financial function of the accounting profession. However, financial accounting is the reporting of historical financial information, while financial management is concerned with the deployment of capital resources to increase a firm's value to the shareholders.

History

Corporate finance for the pre-industrial world began to emerge in the Italian city-states and the low countries of Europe from the 15th century.

The Dutch East India Company (also known by the abbreviation “VOC” in Dutch) was the first publicly listed company ever to pay regular dividends. 
The VOC was also the first recorded joint-stock company to get a fixed capital stock. Public markets for investment securities developed in the Dutch Republic during the 17th century.

By the early 1800s, London acted as a center of corporate finance for companies around the world, which innovated new forms of lending and investment; see . 
The twentieth century brought the rise of managerial capitalism and common stock finance, with share capital raised through listings, in preference to other sources of capital.

Modern corporate finance, alongside investment management, developed in the second half of the 20th century, particularly driven by innovations in theory and practice in the United States and Britain.
Here, see the later sections of History of banking in the United States and of History of private equity and venture capital.

Outline
The primary goal of financial management is to maximize or to continually increase shareholder value. Maximizing shareholder value requires managers to be able to balance capital funding between investments in "projects" that increase the firm's long term profitability and sustainability, along with paying excess cash in the form of dividends to shareholders. Managers of growth companies (i.e. firms that earn high rates of return on invested capital) will use most of the firm's capital resources and surplus cash on investments and projects so the company can continue to expand its business operations into the future. When companies reach maturity levels within their industry (i.e. companies that earn approximately average or lower returns on invested capital), managers of these companies will use surplus cash to payout dividends to shareholders. Managers must do an analysis to determine the appropriate allocation of the firm's capital resources and cash surplus between projects and payouts of dividends to shareholders, as well as paying back creditor related debt.

Choosing between investment projects will thus be based upon several inter-related criteria. (1) Corporate management seeks to maximize the value of the firm by investing in projects which yield a positive net present value when valued using an appropriate discount rate in consideration of risk. (2) These projects must also be financed appropriately. (3) If no growth is possible by the company and excess cash surplus is not needed to the firm, then financial theory suggests that management should return some or all of the excess cash to shareholders (i.e., distribution via dividends).

This "capital budgeting" is the planning of value-adding, long-term corporate financial projects relating to investments funded through and affecting the firm's capital structure.  Management must allocate the firm's limited resources between competing opportunities (projects).

Capital budgeting is also concerned with the setting of criteria about which projects should receive investment funding to increase the value of the firm, and whether to finance that investment with equity or debt capital. Investments should be made on the basis of value-added to the future of the corporation. Projects that increase a firm's value may include a wide variety of different types of investments, including but not limited to, expansion policies, or mergers and acquisitions. When no growth or expansion is possible by a corporation and excess cash surplus exists and is not needed, then management is expected to pay out some or all of those surplus earnings in the form of cash dividends or to repurchase the company's stock through a share buyback program.

Capital structure 

Achieving the goals of corporate finance requires that any corporate investment be financed appropriately. The sources of financing are, generically, capital self-generated by the firm and capital from external funders, obtained by issuing new debt and equity (and hybrid- or convertible securities). However, as above, since both hurdle rate and cash flows (and hence the riskiness of the firm) will be affected, the financing mix will impact the valuation of the firm, and a considered decision is required here. See Balance sheet, WACC.
Finally, there is much theoretical discussion as to other considerations that management might weigh here.

Sources of capital

Debt capital

Corporations may rely on borrowed funds (debt capital or credit) as sources of investment to sustain ongoing business operations or to fund future growth.  Debt comes in several forms, such as through bank loans, notes payable, or bonds issued to the public.  Bonds require the corporations to make regular interest payments (interest expenses) on the borrowed capital until the debt reaches its maturity date, therein the firm must pay back the obligation in full.  Debt payments can also be made in the form of sinking fund provisions, whereby the corporation pays annual installments of the borrowed debt above regular interest charges.  Corporations that issue callable bonds are entitled to pay back the obligation in full whenever the company feels it is in their best interest to pay off the debt payments.  If interest expenses cannot be made by the corporation through cash payments, the firm may also use collateral assets as a form of repaying their debt obligations (or through the process of liquidation).

Equity capital
Corporations can alternatively sell shares of the company to investors to raise capital.  Investors, or shareholders, expect that there will be an upward trend in value of the company (or appreciate in value) over time to make their investment a profitable purchase.  Shareholder value is increased when corporations invest equity capital and other funds into projects (or investments) that earn a positive rate of return for the owners.  Investors prefer to buy shares of stock in companies that will consistently earn a positive rate of return on capital in the future, thus increasing the market value of the stock of that corporation.  Shareholder value may also be increased when corporations payout excess cash surplus (funds from retained earnings that are not needed for business) in the form of dividends.

Preferred stock
Preferred stock is an equity security which may have any combination of features not possessed by common stock including properties of both an equity and a debt instrument, and is generally considered a hybrid instrument. Preferreds are senior (i.e. higher ranking) to common stock, but subordinate to bonds in terms of claim (or rights to their share of the assets of the company).

Preferred stock usually carries no voting rights, but may carry a dividend and may have priority over common stock in the payment of dividends and upon liquidation. Terms of the preferred stock are stated in a "Certificate of Designation".

Similar to bonds, preferred stocks are rated by the major credit-rating companies. The rating for preferreds is generally lower, since preferred dividends do not carry the same guarantees as interest payments from bonds and they are junior to all creditors.

Preferred stock is a special class of shares which may have any combination of features not possessed by common stock.
The following features are usually associated with preferred stock:
 Preference in dividends
 Preference in assets, in the event of liquidation
 Convertibility to common stock.
 Callability, at the option of the corporation
 Nonvoting

Capitalization structure

As mentioned, the financing mix will impact the valuation of the firm: there are then two interrelated considerations here:
 Management must identify the "optimal mix" of financing – the capital structure that results in maximum firm value, - but must also take other factors into account (see trade-off theory below). Financing a project through debt results in a liability or obligation that must be serviced, thus entailing cash flow implications independent of the project's degree of success. Equity financing is less risky with respect to cash flow commitments, but results in a dilution of share ownership, control and earnings. The cost of equity (see CAPM and APT) is also typically higher than the cost of debt - which is, additionally, a deductible expense – and so equity financing may result in an increased hurdle rate which may offset any reduction in cash flow risk.
 Management must attempt to match the long-term financing mix to the assets being financed as closely as possible, in terms of both timing and cash flows. Managing any potential asset liability mismatch or duration gap entails matching the assets and liabilities respectively according to maturity pattern ("cashflow matching") or duration ("immunization"); managing this relationship in the short-term is a major function of working capital management, as discussed below. Other techniques, such as securitization, or hedging using interest rate- or credit derivatives, are also common. See: Asset liability management; Treasury management; Credit risk; Interest rate risk.

Related considerations
Much of the theory here, falls under the umbrella of the Trade-Off Theory in which firms are assumed to trade-off the tax benefits of debt with the bankruptcy costs of debt when choosing how to allocate the company's resources. However economists have developed a set of alternative theories about how managers allocate a corporation's finances.

One of the main alternative theories of how firms manage their capital funds is the Pecking Order Theory (Stewart Myers), which suggests that firms avoid external financing while they have internal financing available and avoid new equity financing while they can engage in new debt financing at reasonably low interest rates.

Also, the capital structure substitution theory hypothesizes that management manipulates the capital structure such that earnings per share (EPS) are maximized. An emerging area in finance theory is right-financing whereby investment banks and corporations can enhance investment return and company value over time by determining the right investment objectives, policy framework, institutional structure, source of financing (debt or equity) and expenditure framework within a given economy and under given market conditions.

One of the more recent innovations in this area from a theoretical point of view is the market timing hypothesis. This hypothesis, inspired in the behavioral finance literature, states that firms look for the cheaper type of financing regardless of their current levels of internal resources, debt and equity.

Investment and project valuation

In general, each "project's" value will be estimated using a discounted cash flow (DCF) valuation, and the opportunity with the highest value, as measured by the resultant net present value (NPV) will be selected (first applied in a corporate finance setting by Joel Dean in 1951). This requires estimating the size and timing of all of the incremental cash flows resulting from the project. Such future cash flows are then discounted to determine their present value (see Time value of money). These present values are then summed, and this sum net of the initial investment outlay is the NPV. See  for general discussion, and Valuation using discounted cash flows for the mechanics, with discussion re modifications for corporate finance.

The NPV is greatly affected by the discount rate. Thus, identifying the proper discount rate – often termed, the project "hurdle rate" – is critical to choosing appropriate projects and investments for the firm. The hurdle rate is the minimum acceptable return on an investment – i.e., the project appropriate discount rate. The hurdle rate should reflect the riskiness of the investment, typically measured by volatility of cash flows, and must take into account the project-relevant financing mix. Managers use models such as the CAPM or the APT to estimate a discount rate appropriate for a particular project, and use the weighted average cost of capital (WACC) to reflect the financing mix selected. (A common error in choosing a discount rate for a project is to apply a WACC that applies to the entire firm. Such an approach may not be appropriate where the risk of a particular project differs markedly from that of the firm's existing portfolio of assets.)

In conjunction with NPV, there are several other measures used as (secondary) selection criteria in corporate finance; see . These are visible from the DCF and include discounted payback period, IRR, Modified IRR, equivalent annuity, capital efficiency, and ROI. Alternatives (complements) to NPV, which more directly consider economic profit, include residual income valuation, MVA / EVA (Joel Stern, Stern Stewart & Co) and APV (Stewart Myers). With the cost of capital correctly and correspondingly adjusted, these valuations should yield the same result as the DCF. See also list of valuation topics.

Valuing flexibility

In many cases, for example R&D projects, a project may open (or close) various paths of action to the company, but this reality will not (typically) be captured in a strict NPV approach. Some analysts account for this uncertainty by adjusting the discount rate (e.g. by increasing the cost of capital) or the cash flows (using certainty equivalents, or applying (subjective) "haircuts" to the forecast numbers; see Penalized present value). Even when employed, however, these latter methods do not normally properly account for changes in risk over the project's lifecycle and hence fail to appropriately adapt the risk adjustment.  Management will therefore (sometimes) employ tools which place an explicit value on these options. So, whereas in a DCF valuation the most likely or average or scenario specific cash flows are discounted, here the "flexible and staged nature" of the investment is modelled, and hence "all" potential payoffs are considered. See further under Real options valuation. The difference between the two valuations is the "value of flexibility" inherent in the project.

The two most common tools are Decision Tree Analysis (DTA) and real options valuation (ROV); they may often be used interchangeably:

 DTA values flexibility by incorporating possible events (or states) and consequent management decisions. (For example, a company would build a factory given that demand for its product exceeded a certain level during the pilot-phase, and outsource production otherwise. In turn, given further demand, it would similarly expand the factory, and maintain it otherwise. In a DCF model, by contrast, there is no "branching" – each scenario must be modelled separately.) In the decision tree, each management decision in response to an "event" generates a "branch" or "path" which the company could follow; the probabilities of each event are determined or specified by management. Once the tree is constructed: (1) "all" possible events and their resultant paths are visible to management; (2) given this "knowledge" of the events that could follow, and assuming rational decision making, management chooses the branches (i.e. actions) corresponding to the highest value path probability weighted; (3) this path is then taken as representative of project value. See .
 ROV is usually used when the value of a project is contingent on the value of some other asset or underlying variable. (For example, the viability of a mining project is contingent on the price of gold; if the price is too low, management will abandon the mining rights, if sufficiently high, management will develop the ore body. Again, a DCF valuation would capture only one of these outcomes.) Here: (1) using financial option theory as a framework, the decision to be taken is identified as corresponding to either a call option or a put option; (2) an appropriate valuation technique is then employed – usually a variant on the binomial options model or a bespoke simulation model, while Black–Scholes type formulae are used less often; see Contingent claim valuation. (3) The "true" value of the project is then the NPV of the "most likely" scenario plus the option value. (Real options in corporate finance were first discussed by Stewart Myers in 1977; viewing corporate strategy as a series of options was originally per Timothy Luehrman, in the late 1990s.)  See also § Option pricing approaches under Business valuation.

Quantifying uncertainty

Given the uncertainty inherent in project forecasting and valuation, analysts will wish to assess the sensitivity of project NPV to the various inputs (i.e. assumptions) to the DCF model. In a typical sensitivity analysis the analyst will vary one key factor while holding all other inputs constant, ceteris paribus. The sensitivity of NPV to a change in that factor is then observed, and is calculated as a "slope": ΔNPV / Δfactor. For example, the analyst will determine NPV at various growth rates in annual revenue as specified (usually at set increments, e.g. -10%, -5%, 0%, 5%...), and then determine the sensitivity using this formula. Often, several variables may be of interest, and their various combinations produce a "value-surface" (or even a "value-space"), where NPV is then a function of several variables. See also Stress testing.

Using a related technique, analysts also run scenario based forecasts of NPV. Here, a scenario comprises a particular outcome for economy-wide, "global" factors (demand for the product, exchange rates, commodity prices, etc.) as well as for company-specific factors (unit costs, etc.). As an example, the analyst may specify various revenue growth scenarios (e.g. -5% for "Worst Case", +5% for "Likely Case" and +15% for "Best Case"), where all key inputs are adjusted so as to be consistent with the growth assumptions, and calculate the NPV for each. Note that for scenario based analysis, the various combinations of inputs must be internally consistent (see discussion at Financial modeling), whereas for the sensitivity approach these need not be so.  An application of this methodology is to determine an "unbiased" NPV, where management determines a (subjective) probability for each scenario – the NPV for the project is then the probability-weighted average of the various scenarios; see First Chicago Method. (See also rNPV, where cash flows, as opposed to scenarios, are probability-weighted.)

A further advancement which "overcomes the limitations of sensitivity and scenario analyses by examining the effects of all possible combinations of variables and their realizations" is to construct stochastic or probabilistic financial models – as opposed to the traditional static and deterministic models as above. For this purpose, the most common method is to use Monte Carlo simulation to analyze the project's NPV. This method was introduced to finance by David B. Hertz in 1964, although it has only recently become common: today analysts are even able to run simulations in spreadsheet based DCF models, typically using a risk-analysis add-in, such as @Risk or Crystal Ball. Here, the cash flow components that are (heavily) impacted by uncertainty are simulated, mathematically reflecting their "random characteristics". In contrast to the scenario approach above, the simulation produces several thousand random but possible outcomes, or trials, "covering all conceivable real world contingencies in proportion to their likelihood;" see Monte Carlo Simulation versus "What If" Scenarios. The output is then a histogram of project NPV, and the average NPV of the potential investment – as well as its volatility and other sensitivities – is then observed. This histogram provides information not visible from the static DCF: for example, it allows for an estimate of the probability that a project has a net present value greater than zero (or any other value).

Continuing the above example: instead of assigning three discrete values to revenue growth, and to the other relevant variables, the analyst would assign an appropriate probability distribution to each variable (commonly triangular or beta), and, where possible, specify the observed or supposed correlation between the variables. These distributions would then be "sampled" repeatedly – incorporating this correlation – so as to generate several thousand random but possible scenarios, with corresponding valuations, which are then used to generate the NPV histogram. The resultant statistics (average NPV and standard deviation of NPV) will be a more accurate mirror of the project's "randomness" than the variance observed under the scenario based approach. These are often used as estimates of the underlying "spot price" and volatility for the real option valuation as above; see . A more robust Monte Carlo model would include the possible occurrence of risk events (e.g., a credit crunch) that drive variations in one or more of the DCF model inputs.

Dividend policy

Dividend policy is concerned with financial policies regarding the payment of a cash dividend in the present or paying an increased dividend at a later stage.  Whether to issue dividends, and what amount, is determined mainly on the basis of the company's unappropriated profit (excess cash) and influenced by the company's long-term earning power. When cash surplus exists and is not needed by the firm, then management is expected to pay out some or all of those surplus earnings in the form of cash dividends or to repurchase the company's stock through a share buyback program.

If there are no NPV positive opportunities, i.e. projects where returns exceed the hurdle rate, and excess cash surplus is not needed, then – finance theory suggests – management should return some or all of the excess cash to shareholders as dividends. This is the general case, however there are exceptions. For example, shareholders of a "growth stock", expect that the company will, almost by definition, retain most of the excess cash surplus so as to fund future projects internally to help increase the value of the firm.

Management must also choose the form of the dividend distribution, as stated, generally as cash dividends or via a share buyback. Various factors may be taken into consideration: where shareholders must pay tax on dividends, firms may elect to retain earnings or to perform a stock buyback, in both cases increasing the value of shares outstanding. Alternatively, some companies will pay "dividends" from stock rather than in cash; see Corporate action.  Financial theory suggests that the dividend policy should be set based upon the type of company and what management determines is the best use of those dividend resources for the firm to its shareholders.

As a general rule, then, shareholders of growth companies would prefer managers to retain earnings and pay no dividends (use excess cash to reinvest into the company's operations), whereas shareholders of value- or secondary stocks would prefer the management of these companies to payout surplus earnings in the form of cash dividends when a positive return cannot be earned through the reinvestment of undistributed earnings.  A share buyback program may be accepted when the value of the stock is greater than the returns to be realized from the reinvestment of undistributed profits.  In all instances, the appropriate dividend policy is usually directed by that which maximizes long-term shareholder value.

Working capital management

Managing the corporation's working capital position to sustain ongoing business operations is referred to as working capital management. These involve managing the relationship between a firm's short-term assets and its short-term liabilities.

In general this is as follows: As above, the goal of Corporate Finance is the maximization of firm value. In the context of long term, capital budgeting, firm value is enhanced through appropriately selecting and funding NPV positive investments. These investments, in turn, have implications in terms of cash flow and cost of capital.
The goal of Working Capital (i.e. short term) management is therefore to ensure that the firm is able to operate, and that it has sufficient cash flow to service long-term debt, and to satisfy both maturing short-term debt and upcoming operational expenses. In so doing, firm value is enhanced when, and if, the return on capital exceeds the cost of capital; See Economic value added (EVA).  Managing short term finance and long term finance is one task of a modern CFO.

Working capital
Working capital is the amount of funds that are necessary for an organization to continue its ongoing business operations, until the firm is reimbursed through payments for the goods or services it has delivered to its customers.  Working capital is measured through the difference between resources in cash or readily convertible into cash (Current Assets), and cash requirements (Current Liabilities). As a result, capital resource allocations relating to working capital are always current, i.e. short-term.

In addition to time horizon, working capital management differs from capital budgeting in terms of discounting and profitability considerations; decisions here are also "reversible" to a much larger extent. (Considerations as to risk appetite and return targets remain identical, although some constraints – such as those imposed by loan covenants – may be more relevant here).

The (short term) goals of working capital are therefore not approached on the same basis as (long term) profitability, and working capital management applies different criteria in allocating resources: the main considerations are (1) cash flow / liquidity and (2) profitability / return on capital (of which cash flow is probably the most important).
 The most widely used measure of cash flow is the net operating cycle, or cash conversion cycle. This represents the time difference between cash payment for raw materials and cash collection for sales. The cash conversion cycle indicates the firm's ability to convert its resources into cash. Because this number effectively corresponds to the time that the firm's cash is tied up in operations and unavailable for other activities, management generally aims at a low net count. (Another measure is gross operating cycle which is the same as net operating cycle except that it does not take into account the creditors deferral period.)
 In this context, the most useful measure of profitability is return on capital (ROC). The result is shown as a percentage, determined by dividing relevant income for the 12 months by capital employed; return on equity (ROE) shows this result for the firm's shareholders. As above, firm value is enhanced when, and if, the return on capital exceeds the cost of capital.

Management of working capital
Guided by the above criteria, management will use a combination of policies and techniques for the management of working capital. These policies aim at managing the current assets (generally cash and cash equivalents, inventories and debtors) and the short term financing, such that cash flows and returns are acceptable.
 Cash management. Identify the cash balance which allows for the business to meet day to day expenses, but reduces cash holding costs.
 Inventory management. Identify the level of inventory which allows for uninterrupted production but reduces the investment in raw materials – and minimizes reordering costs – and hence increases cash flow. See discussion under Inventory optimization and Supply chain management. Note that "inventory" is usually the realm of operations management: given the potential impact on cash flow, and on the balance sheet in general, finance typically "gets involved in an oversight or policing way".  
 Debtors management. There are two inter-related roles here:  (1) Identify the appropriate credit policy, i.e. credit terms which will attract customers, such that any impact on cash flows and the cash conversion cycle will be offset by increased revenue and hence Return on Capital (or vice versa); see Discounts and allowances.  (2) Implement appropriate credit scoring policies and techniques such that the risk of default on any new business is acceptable given these criteria.
 Short term financing. Identify the appropriate source of financing, given the cash conversion cycle: the inventory is ideally financed by credit granted by the supplier; however, it may be necessary to utilize a bank loan (or overdraft), or to "convert debtors to cash" through "factoring"; see generally, trade finance.

Relationship with other areas in finance

Investment banking

Use of the term "corporate finance" varies considerably across the world. In the United States it is used, as above, to describe activities, analytical methods and techniques that deal with many aspects of a company's finances and capital. In the United Kingdom and Commonwealth countries, the terms "corporate finance" and "corporate financier" tend to be associated with investment banking – i.e. with transactions in which capital is raised for the corporation.

Financial risk management

Financial risk management,  generically, is focused on measuring and managing  market risk, credit risk and operational risk.
Within corporates,  the scope is broadened to overlap enterprise risk management, 
and then addresses risks to the firm's overall strategic objectives,
focusing on the financial exposures and opportunities arising from business decisions, and their link to the firm’s appetite for risk, as well as their impact on share price.
The discipline is thus related to corporate finance, both re operations and funding, as below; and in large firms, the risk management function then overlaps "Corporate Finance", with the CRO consulted on capital-investment and other strategic decisions. 
Both areas share the goal of enhancing, and preserving, the firm's economic value.  Here, businesses actively manage any impact on profitability, cash flow, and hence firm value, due to credit and operational factors - this, overlapping "working capital management" to a large extent.  Firms then devote much time and effort to forecasting, analytics and performance monitoring.  (See also FP&A, "ALM" and treasury management.)
Firm exposure to market (and business) risk is a direct result of previous capital investments and funding decisions: where applicable here, typically in large corporates and under guidance from their investment bankers, firms actively manage and hedge  these exposures using traded financial instruments, usually  standard derivatives, creating cash flow-, commodity- and foreign exchange hedges. (See Hedge accounting, Hedging irrelevance proposition.)

See also

 
 
 Corporate tax
 Corporate governance
 Financial accounting
 Financial management 
 Financial planning
 Financial ratio
 Financial statement analysis
 Growth stock
 Investment bank
 Private equity
 Security (finance)
 Stock market
 Strategic financial management
 Venture capital
 

Lists:
 List of accounting topics
 List of finance topics
 List of corporate finance topics
 List of valuation topics

References

Bibliography

Further reading
 In The Modern Theory of Corporate Finance, edited by Michael C. Jensen and Clifford H. Smith Jr., pp. 2–20. McGraw-Hill, 1990.

External links

 Corporate Finance Overview - Corporate Finance Institute